Convoy HX 49 was a North Atlantic convoy of the HX series which ran during the Battle of the Atlantic in World War II. It was the 49th of the numbered series of merchant convoys run by the Allies from Halifax to Liverpool. The convoy was attacked by German U-boats, losing three of its 50 ships sunk. Another ship was lost after dispersal.

Background
HX 49 was formed of two sections sailing from the Americas. 
The main body, of 26 ships, departed Halifax on 9 June 1940 with ships gathered from the US eastern seaboard; it was led by convoy commodore vice-admiral LD Mackinnon RN in the steamship Eurybates. It was accompanied by its ocean escort, the Armed Merchant Cruiser Ausonia, and a local escort of two RCN destroyers.

On  13 June the convoy was joined by BHX 49, 24 ships from the Caribbean and South America, that had gathered at Bermuda, departing there on  8 June escorted by the AMC Ragputana and a local escort.
 
Ranged against HX 49 were U-boats of the German Navy's U-boat Arm, on patrol in Britain's South West Approaches. The UBW had five U-boats in area when contact was made on 21 June 1940.

Action
During the crossing two ships had dropped out of convoy; both arrived safely.

The following evening  found HX 49 about 50 miles south of Cape Clear Island. Her commander, rising star Gunther Prien, took her into the middle of the convoy and sank the tanker San Fernando. The U-boat then had to crash-dive to avoid being run down by a freighter, but the attack caused the convoy to scatter. 

At daybreak on 22 June the two sloops began to gather the ships back together, and HX 49 continued without further loss. The main body arrived in Liverpool on 24 June.

Ships lost

References

Bibliography
Blair, Clay (1996) Hitler's U-boat War Vol I Cassell 
 Arnold Hague (2000) The Allied Convoy System 1939–1945 

HX049
Conflicts in 1940
Naval battles of World War II involving the United Kingdom
Naval battles of World War II involving Germany
Naval battles of World War II involving Canada